Collie Street is in Fremantle, Western Australia.

It commences at South Terrace and proceeds to Marine Terrace.

It defines the south eastern boundary of the Fremantle West End Heritage area between Market Street and Marine Terrace.

The street is named after Alexander Collie, the surgeon aboard .

In the early 1900s the residences of the street were afflicted with bubonic plague.

Notable buildings found along the street include:
 Fremantle Trades Hall, on the corner of Pakenham Street
 Oceanic Hotel, formerly known as the Collie Hotel, on the corner of Pakenham Street
 Esplanade Hotel, on the corner of Marine Terrace and Essex Street

Notes

 
Streets in Fremantle